East 34th Street Heliport  is a heliport on the east side of Manhattan located on the East River Greenway, between the East River and the FDR Drive viaduct. Also known as the Atlantic Metroport at East 34th Street, it is a public heliport owned by New York City and run by the Economic Development Corporation.

History
The East 34th Street Heliport opened on the site of the original East 34th Street Ferry Landing in 1972, providing charter, commuter, and sightseeing flights. It served as a replacement for the heliport atop the Pan Am Building, which closed in 1968. (That heliport reopened for three months in 1977 before a helicopter crash killed five people.) 

During the 1980s and early 1990s, New York Helicopter operated frequent scheduled service from the heliport to New York's John F. Kennedy International Airport. Fourteen-seat turbine-powered Sikorsky S-58T helicopters were used on this service.

After several residential high rises were built in the neighborhood in the 1980s, the city was pressured into reducing helicopter traffic in the area. Sightseeing flights were banned from the heliport in 1997. In 1998, flights were limited to 8 a.m. to 8 p.m. on weekdays and 10 a.m. to 6 pm on weekends. Weekend flights were banned altogether later in the year.

US Helicopter provided regular passenger service from the Heliport to JFK and Newark Liberty International Airport from 2007 to September 2009.

Current operations
Since this is a heliport and not an airport, there are no instrument procedures for this facility. Boats in the nearby East River require pilots to be careful when approaching the heliport's landing pad.

Statistics 
In 2010, 72% of the flights were air taxi, 18% general aviation, 9% commuters, and less than 1% military. In 2017, 96% were air taxi, 3% transient general aviation, and 2% military.

Accidents and incidents 
 On May 23, 1974, David Frank Kamaiko, a 22-year man from Greenwich Village claiming to be a member of the Jewish Defense League, hijacked a helicopter from the East 34th Street Heliport and demanded $2 million in ransom. After landing on top of the Pan Am Building, the pilot tried to escape and Kamaiko shot him in the arm. The hijacker was held by the other hostage inside the helicopter until he was taken into custody by police.
 On February 27, 1975, a Bell 47G-2A on a non-commercial flight from Garden City crashed into a fence while attempting to land at the 34th Street Heliport in gusty wind conditions. The pilot survived but was severely burned in the resulting fire.
On April 26, 1985, the engine on an Aérospatiale SA 360 Dauphin failed shortly after takeoff from the East 34th Street Heliport, sending the helicopter into the East River. Five passengers and two crewmembers were rescued but one passenger trapped inside the submerged craft was killed.
 On May 2, 1988, a Bell 206-B on a sightseeing flight around Manhattan crashed into the East River near Long Island City while preparing to land at the East 34th Street Heliport, killing one person and injuring four others.
 On February 10, 1990, a strong gust of wind sent a Bell 206-L on a sightseeing flight crashing into the East River shortly after taking off from the East 34th Street Heliport. A 14-year-old boy was unconscious when pulled from the wreckage and later died. The pilot and three other passengers (including the boy's father and two French tourists) were injured but survived the crash.
 On June 17, 2005, a Sikorsky S-76C carrying six corporate executives from MBNA returning to Delaware after a business meeting in New York City crashed into the East River less than one minute after taking off from the East 34th Street Heliport. All eight people aboard survived the crash.
 On October 4, 2011, a Bell 206 crashed into the East River killing one person after taking off from the East 34th Street Heliport. The pilot and three other passengers on board were rescued. One week after the accident, a second passenger died as a result of injuries sustained in the crash.
 On June 10, 2019, an AgustaWestland AW109 Power en route to Linden, New Jersey, crashed into the AXA Equitable Center, Seventh Avenue, which sparked a fire on the top of the building, killing the pilot Tim McCormack.

See also 
Aviation in the New York metropolitan area
Downtown Manhattan Wall Street Heliport
East 34th Street Ferry Landing
West 30th Street Heliport

References 
Notes

External links

Aviation in New York City
Transportation buildings and structures in Manhattan
Heliports in New York (state)
Airports established in 1972
1972 establishments in New York City
34th Street (Manhattan)